Ysgol Gyfun y Strade is a Welsh medium secondary school and sixth form in the town of Llanelli, Wales. It opened in September 1977 as a comprehensive school for boys and girls. As of 2020, there were 1,177 pupils enrolled at the school.

The school's motto is "Nid da lle gellir gwell" — literally, (it is) not good where capable of (being) better, i.e. never settle for second-best; or, there is always room for improvement.

The current headmaster is Geoff Evans. He took over from the previous headmistress, Heather Lewis, in 2017. Lewis became headmistress in 2009.

The school has a successful rugby team which competes in the Rosslyn Park National School Sevens annually. They were runners up to Millfield School in 2003. The school lost in the semi final the National Urdd Sevens Tournament in 2010. The school's year 8 team won the Urdd National Sevens in 2010 and the same year group also won the under 15s Urdd National Sevens tournament in 2012 and were unbeaten throughout both tournaments. The under 15s also won the Urdd National Sevens tournament in 2013 and were unbeaten in the tournament.

In 2013, the school performed an original musical 'Grav' that was based on the life of late rugby star, Ray Gravell. The musical was completely in Welsh and performed by pupils from the school of all ages. It attracted a large audience throughout South Wales; resulting in a shortened version being performed in the National Eisteddfod the following year in Llanelli.

The arts department within the school has also achieved many accolades throughout the nation. The choir have featured numerous times on the BBC in competitions such as Songs of Praise, with some members also taking part in the Eurovision Choir of the Year competition in 2017. Many awards have also been won in The National Eisteddfod with recitation groups, choirs, drama performances, solo and duet singing, and public speaking.

The school featured in S4C's Hip neu Sgip?: Yn erbyn y cloc in 2011, in a cafeteria makeover which took place at the school in September 2010.

Extensions and Improvements 

In 2015, a standalone extension for the Science and Design & Technology departments was completed. As a part of the project, the existing facilities used by the departments mentioned were converted and refurbished into classrooms for departments including music, media, and drama. A new lounge and study area for the school's sixth form was also introduced. In total the project cost £8.245 million, with the Welsh Government footing 50% of the investment as a part of its 21st Century Schools and Colleges Programme. Carmarthenshire County Council contributed the rest through its Modernising Education Programme.

As a part of the Welsh Government's 'Cymraeg 2050' strategy, Jeremy Miles, the Minister for Education and Welsh Language, announced that a £4.4 million investment would be dedicated to a new 'Welsh Language Immersion Centre' at Ysgol Gyfun y Strade. The investment also seeks to increase the school's capacity by 228.

COVID-19 Response 
The UK's response to the pandemic meant that Ysgol y Strade, like all schools, was closed until the end of June 2020. From then, many schools in Wales reopened from the end of June until the summer to trial how they would reopen in the next academic year. Shortly after reopening for the next academic year, pupils in Year 10 were forced into self-isolation after a pupil tested positive for the virus. Similar cases plagued the school throughout the pandemic.

The school was praised for introducing a "Botwm Becso" ("Concern Button") during the pandemic. The button, placed on the school's website, allowed pupils to voice their concerns directly to the school's assistant head teacher in a confidential manner. The assistant head teacher would then decide how best to support the pupil. The scheme was highlighted in Estyn's 20-21 Annual Report.

Notable former pupils

 Josh Adams, Wales and British and Irish Lions rugby player.
 Liam Davies, Scarlets rugby player.
 Garan Evans, Scarlets and Wales rugby player.
 Gavin Evans, Scarlets and Wales rugby player.
 Trystan Gravelle, actor
 Emyr Huws, Wales National Football Team midfielder.
 Phil John, Scarlets rugby player.
 Ceiron Thomas, Scarlets rugby player. 
 Imogen Thomas, former Miss Wales and Big Brother (TV series) celebrity.
 Steff Evans, Scarlets and Wales rugby player.

Sport
The school is also six from six in the rugby season for 2012/2013 with victories over Tregib x2, Bro Myrddin, Preseli, Olchfa and Amman Valley.

References

External links
Website

1977 establishments in Wales
Educational institutions established in 1977
Secondary schools in Carmarthenshire
Welsh-language schools